Limnohelina  is a genus of flies in the family Muscidae.

Species
Limnohelina bivittata
Limnohelina debilis
Limnohelina dorsovittata
Limnohelina grisea
Limnohelina huttoni
Limnohelina nelsoni
Limnohelina nigripes
Limnohelina smithii
Limnohelina spinipes
Limnohelina uniformis

References

Muscidae
Muscidae genera